Matthew John Anderson (born April 18, 1987) is an American professional volleyball player. He is part of the US national team, a bronze medalist at the Olympic Games Rio 2016 and the 2018 World Championship, 2014 World League and 2015 World Cup winner. He is a multiple winner of the CEV Champions League with the Russian club Zenit Kazan. At the professional club level, he plays for Zenit Saint Petersburg.

Personal life
Matthew Anderson was born in Buffalo, New York to Michael and Nancy Anderson on April 18, 1987. His father died in January 2010. He is the youngest of five children, having three older sisters named Jennifer, Joelle, and Amy and one older brother named Joshua. He has many tattoos dedicated to family members including his late father, wife, and son. Matthew graduated from West Seneca West Senior High School in 2005. He attended Penn State for college. 
On August 29, 2020, he married Jacquelyn Marie Gillum. Jackie gave birth to their son “Jamie” Michael James Anderson on January 31, 2020. On April 9 2022 they welcomed their daughter Virginia June “Juno".

Career

Clubs
In his senior year, he led the West Seneca boys' volleyball team to a 17-0 regular-season record and a Sectional Finals appearance, losing to eventual state champion, Hamburg, in 3 sets. In 2004, the team were the 2004 Division I State Champions. He played club volleyball for Eden Volleyball Club in Eden, New York.  Anderson followed an uncharacteristic growth path in his youth – only reaching his full height (6'8") as a Sophomore at Penn State.  His original position was middle – playing that in his Sophomore and Junior seasons of high school.  As he became more experienced in the game, he spent more time in the Outside and Right-side for Eden VBC.

Anderson finished his career in Penn State with 1,212 kills and 82 aces, both which rank in the top 13 in Penn State history. He had a decorated career, especially in 2008 as he helped lead the Nittany Lions to their second ever NCAA Men's Volleyball Championship against Pepperdine. He was named the NCAA Championship Most Outstanding Player for his 29 kill performance against the Waves. Other awards for 2008 include EIVA Player of the Year, AVCA National Player of the Year, AVCA First Team All-America, and All-EIVA First Team.

On July 1, 2008, he announced he would forgo his 2009 senior year at Penn State and signed a professional contract with Hyundai Capital Skywalkers of the Korean League In his debut season, Anderson helped the Skywalkers claim first in the regular season before losing 3-1 in the championship series. Season 2010–2011 spent in the Italian League as a player of Tonno Callipo Vibo Valentia. Then he moved to Casa Modena. In 2012, he moved to Zenit Kazan in Russia. With this club, he won a bronze medal in the Russian Championship and CEV Champions League in 2012–13. In the season 2013–14, his team won the title of Russian Champion and Anderson was the Most Valuable Player of the Russian League.

On October 29, 2014, Anderson suspended his volleyball career. He asked for the termination of the contract with Zenit Kazan because of depression. On December 26, 2014 Anderson announced his return to Zenit Kazan, but only in CEV Champions League matches.

On February 13, 2017, Anderson announced that he had signed a contract to remain with Zenit Kazan for another season.

Anderson decided to return to Modena Volley for the 2019–20 season.

National team
In September 2013 USA, including Anderson, achieved a title of the NORCECA Champion. On July 20, 2014 he was part of the team that won a gold medal of the 2014 World League.

Honours

Clubs
 CEV Champions League
  2014/2015 – with Zenit Kazan
  2015/2016 – with Zenit Kazan
  2016/2017 – with Zenit Kazan
  2017/2018 – with Zenit Kazan
  2018/2019 – with Zenit Kazan

 FIVB Club World Championship
  Betim 2015 – with Zenit Kazan
  Betim 2016 – with Zenit Kazan
  Poland 2017 – with Zenit Kazan

 National championships
 2008/2009  South Korean Championship, with Cheonan Hyundai Capital Skywalkers
 2012/2013  Russian SuperCup, with Zenit Kazan
 2013/2014  Russian Championship, with Zenit Kazan
 2014/2015  Russian Cup, with Zenit Kazan
 2014/2015  Russian Championship, with Zenit Kazan
 2015/2016  Russian SuperCup, with Zenit Kazan
 2015/2016  Russian Cup, with Zenit Kazan
 2015/2016  Russian Championship, with Zenit Kazan
 2016/2017  Russian SuperCup, with Zenit Kazan
 2016/2017  Russian Cup, with Zenit Kazan
 2016/2017  Russian Championship, with Zenit Kazan
 2017/2018  Russian SuperCup, with Zenit Kazan
 2017/2018  Russian Cup, with Zenit Kazan
 2017/2018  Russian Championship, with Zenit Kazan
 2018/2019  Russian SuperCup, with Zenit Kazan
 2018/2019  Russian Cup, with Zenit Kazan
 2021/2022  Italian Cup, with Sir Safety Perugia

Individual awards
 2007: AVCA Second-Team All-American
 2008: AVCA First-Team All-American
 2008: AVCA Co-National Player of the Year
 2008: MIVA – All–Championship Team
 2008: NCAA National Championship – Most Outstanding Player
 2012: Player of the Year United States
 2013: Player of the Year United States
 2013: NORCECA Championship – Most Valuable Player
 2013: NORCECA Championship – Best Outside Spiker
 2014: Russian League – Most Valuable Player
 2014: Player of the Year United States
 2015: FIVB World Cup – Most Valuable Player
 2015: Player of the Year United States
 2017: FIVB World Grand Champions Cup – Best Opposite Spiker
 2018: FIVB Nations League – Best Opposite Spiker
 2018: FIVB World Championship – Best Opposite Spiker
 2019: FIVB Nations League – Best Opposite Spiker
 2019: FIVB Nations League – Most Valuable Player

See also
 List of Pennsylvania State University Olympians

References

External links

 Player profile at TeamUSA.org 
 
 Player profile at LegaVolley.it 
 
 
 Player profile at Volleybox.net

1987 births
Living people
Sportspeople from Buffalo, New York
American men's volleyball players
Russian Champions of men's volleyball
Olympic volleyball players of the United States
Olympic bronze medalists for the United States in volleyball
Volleyball players at the 2012 Summer Olympics
Volleyball players at the 2016 Summer Olympics
Medalists at the 2016 Summer Olympics
Volleyball players at the 2020 Summer Olympics
American expatriate sportspeople in South Korea
Expatriate volleyball players in South Korea
American expatriate sportspeople in Italy
Expatriate volleyball players in Italy
American expatriate sportspeople in Russia
Expatriate volleyball players in Russia
American expatriate sportspeople in China
Expatriate volleyball players in China
Penn State Nittany Lions men's volleyball players
Modena Volley players
Outside hitters
Opposite hitters